The Welsh Archaeological Trusts are four archaeological organisations established in the mid-1970s to respond to rescue archaeology. They are independent charitable trusts which together provide a uniform regional archaeology service across Wales, working closely with Welsh Government and local authorities and forming a 'tripod' of archaeology and cultural heritage institutions with Cadw and the Royal Commission on the Ancient and Historical Monuments of Wales.

The Trusts maintain Historic Environment Records for their respective areas to provide archaeological advice to central government, planning authorities and other public bodies. This heritage management work is supported by Cadw, together with associated archaeological projects and conservation of sites and historic landscapes. Although they perform some of the functions that elsewhere in the UK are delivered by public bodies, the Welsh Archaeological Trusts are independent charities with political and operational autonomy. The Welsh Archaeological Trusts also generate income by providing archaeological consulting and contracting services for a range of clients - both in Wales and elsewhere. They also deliver a wide range of public engagement and archaeological outreach events and activities, with funding from many sources.

The four trusts comprise:

The Welsh HERs were made statutory by the Historic Environment (Wales) Act 2016. This placed an obligation on Welsh Ministers to maintain the HERs, and this duty is discharged by the four Welsh Archaeological Trusts.

On 1 July 2010 the four Welsh Trusts launched their online searchable HER website known as Archwilio, at the Treftadaeth Conference in Swansea.
The site was launched by Alun Ffred Jones AM, Minister for Heritage, who observed “Wales is the first country in Britain that has made all its archaeological records available online”, and “Archwilio will be a tremendous asset not only for the people of Wales but also for those further afield who have an interest in the rich archaeology and cultural heritage of our country”. The site contains the combined record of the four Trusts and gives the public free access to over 100,000 pieces of information about historic sites across Wales.

See also
Archaeology of Wales

References

External links
Cadw overview of legislation and guidance
Current Archaeology article about the Welsh Archaeological Trusts
'Archaeology in Trust' booklet celebrating 40 years of the Welsh Archaeological Trusts
Archwilio website
The Clwyd-Powys Archaeological Trust website
The Dyfed Archaeological Trust website
The Glamorgan-Gwent Archaeological Trust website
The Gwynedd Archaeological Trust website

Archaeology of Wales
Archaeological organizations
Historical organisations based in Wales